Gaudencio Hernández Burgos (born 19 June 1962) is a Mexican politician affiliated with the PRI. He currently serves as Deputy of the LXII Legislature of the Mexican Congress representing Veracruz.

References

1962 births
Living people
Politicians from Hidalgo (state)
Institutional Revolutionary Party politicians
21st-century Mexican politicians
Deputies of the LXII Legislature of Mexico
Members of the Chamber of Deputies (Mexico) for Veracruz